Jungle Boy is a 1987 Indian Malayalam-language film, directed by P. Chandrakumar and produced by P. H. Rasheed. The film stars Irfan, Abhilasha and T. G. Ravi. The film has musical score by S. P. Venkatesh.

Cast

Irfan as Jungle Boy
Abhilasha as Geetha
T. G. Ravi as DFO
Master Kukku
Vijayakumar
Pattom Sadan as Velappan
Raj Kumar
Deepak
Bala Singh
P. Sukumar/ Kiran as Forest Officer Sasi

Soundtrack
The music was composed by S. P. Venkatesh and the lyrics were written by Poovachal Khader.

References

External links
 

1987 films
1980s Malayalam-language films
Films directed by P. Chandrakumar